The bold-striped tit-babbler (Mixornis bornensis) is a species of Old World babbler found in Southeast Asia.

Description
The bold-striped tit-babbler has a distinctive yellowish supercilium and rufous crown. The throat is yellowish with brown streaks.

Call is a loud repeated chonk-chonk-chonk-chonk-chonk somewhat reminiscent of a common tailorbird.

Distribution
The bold-striped tit-babbler is found in Borneo and Java.

Behaviour
Bold-striped tit-babblers forage in small flocks and creep and clamber in low vegetation. They breed in the pre-monsoon season from February to July and build a loose ball-shaped nest made from grasses and leaves.

References

Mixornis
Birds of Malesia
Birds of Borneo
Birds described in 1850
Taxa named by Charles Lucien Bonaparte